A maximum length sequence (MLS) is a type of pseudorandom binary sequence.

They are bit sequences generated using maximal linear-feedback shift registers and are so called because they are periodic and reproduce every binary sequence (except the zero vector) that can be represented by the shift registers (i.e., for length-m registers they produce a sequence of length 2m − 1). An MLS is also sometimes called an n-sequence or an m-sequence. MLSs are spectrally flat, with the exception of a near-zero DC term.

These sequences may be represented as coefficients of irreducible polynomials in a polynomial ring over Z/2Z.

Practical applications for MLS include measuring impulse responses (e.g., of room reverberation or arrival times from towed sources in the ocean). They are also used as a basis for deriving pseudo-random sequences in digital communication systems that employ direct-sequence spread spectrum and frequency-hopping spread spectrum transmission systems, optical dielectric multilayer reflector design, and in the efficient design of some fMRI experiments.

Generation

MLS are generated using maximal linear-feedback shift registers.  An MLS-generating system with a shift register of length 4 is shown in Fig. 1.  It can be expressed using the following recursive relation:

where n is the time index and  represents modulo-2 addition. For bit values 0 = FALSE or 1 = TRUE, this is equivalent to the XOR operation.

As MLS are periodic and shift registers cycle through every possible binary value (with the exception of the zero vector), registers can be initialized to any state, with the exception of the zero vector.

Polynomial interpretation
A polynomial over GF(2) can be associated with the linear-feedback shift register. It has degree of the length of the shift register, and has coefficients that are either 0 or 1, corresponding to the taps of the register that feed the xor gate. For example, the polynomial corresponding to Figure 1 is x4 + x3 + 1.

A necessary and sufficient condition for the sequence generated by a LFSR to be maximal length is that its corresponding polynomial be primitive.

Implementation
MLS are inexpensive to implement in hardware or software, and relatively low-order feedback shift registers can generate long sequences; a sequence generated using a shift register of length 20 is 220 − 1 samples long (1,048,575 samples).

Properties of maximum length sequences
MLS have the following properties, as formulated by Solomon Golomb.

Balance property
The occurrence of 0 and 1 in the sequence should be approximately the same. More precisely, in a maximum length sequence of length  there are  ones and  zeros. The number of ones equals the number of zeros plus one, since the state containing only zeros cannot occur.

Run property
A "run" is a sub-sequence of consecutive "1"s or consecutive "0"s within the MLS concerned. The number of runs is the number of such sub-sequences. 

Of all the "runs" (consisting of "1"s or "0"s) in the sequence :
 One half of the runs are of length 1.
 One quarter of the runs are of length 2.
 One eighth of the runs are of length 3.
 ... etc. ...

Correlation property
The circular autocorrelation of an MLS is a Kronecker delta function (with DC offset and time delay, depending on implementation).  For the ±1 convention, i.e., bit value 1 is assigned  and bit value 0 , mapping XOR to the negative of the product:

where  represents the complex conjugate and  represents a circular shift.

The linear autocorrelation of an MLS approximates a Kronecker delta.

Extraction of impulse responses
If a linear time invariant (LTI) system's impulse response is to be measured using a MLS, the response can be extracted from the measured system output y[n] by taking its circular cross-correlation with the MLS.  This is because the autocorrelation of a MLS is 1 for zero-lag, and nearly zero (−1/N where N is the sequence length) for all other lags; in other words, the autocorrelation of the MLS can be said to approach unit impulse function as MLS length increases.

If the impulse response of a system is h[n] and the MLS is s[n], then

Taking the cross-correlation with respect to s[n] of both sides,

and assuming that φss is an impulse (valid for long sequences)

Any signal with an impulsive autocorrelation can be used for this purpose, but signals with high crest factor, such as the impulse itself, produce impulse responses with poor signal-to-noise ratio.  It is commonly assumed that the MLS would then be the ideal signal, as it consists of only full-scale values and its digital crest factor is the minimum, 0 dB.  However, after analog reconstruction, the sharp discontinuities in the signal produce strong intersample peaks, degrading the crest factor by 4-8 dB or more, increasing with signal length, making it worse than a sine sweep.  Other signals have been designed with minimal crest factor, though it is unknown if it can be improved beyond 3 dB.

Relationship to Hadamard transform
Cohn and Lempel showed the relationship of the MLS to the Hadamard transform.  This relationship allows the correlation of an MLS to be computed in a fast algorithm similar to the FFT.

See also
 Barker code
 Complementary sequences
 Federal Standard 1037C
 Frequency response
 Gold code
 Impulse response
 Polynomial ring

References

External links
  — Short on-line tutorial describing how MLS is used to obtain the impulse response of a linear time-invariant system.  Also describes how nonlinearities in the system can show up as spurious spikes in the apparent impulse response.
   — Paper describing MLS generation. Contains C-code for MLS generation using up to 18-tap-LFSRs and matching Hadamard transform for impulse response extraction.
 A (binaural) room impulse response database generated by means of maximum length sequences.
 — Implementing lfsr's in FPGAs includes listing of taps for 3 to 168 bits

Pseudorandomness
Polynomials
Binary sequences